WAKS-HD2 (96.5-2 FM) is a digital subchannel of WAKS, a commercial radio station licensed to Akron, Ohio, which features an urban contemporary format known as "Real 106.1". Owned by iHeartMedia, Inc., WAKS-HD2 serves Greater Cleveland and surrounding Northeast Ohio and is the FM radio home of Cleveland Charge basketball. Using the proprietary technology HD Radio for its main digital transmission, WAKS-HD2 is also rebroadcast over low-power analog translator W291BV (106.1 FM), and streams online via iHeartRadio. WAKS-HD2's studios are located at the Six Six Eight Building in downtown Cleveland's Gateway District, while the WAKS-HD2 and W291BV transmitters reside in Brecksville and Parma, respectively.

History
A Clear Channel Communications press release dated April 25, 2006, announced the launch of nearly 200 new HD Radio "multicast channels" in dozens of markets across the United States; among these was WAKS-HD2, a digital subchannel for Cleveland market radio station WAKS (96.5 FM), set to broadcast an "all new hits" format. As of September 1, 2006, WAKS-HD2 was still not on the air, but by October 5, 2006, the new channel had launched an "underground dance" format known as "Trancid". As of October 2007, WAKS-HD2 had adopted a new automated format called "Kiwi Radio"; The Plain Dealer described it as a collection of "tweener tunes of the Hannah Montana and High School Musical variety." By June 2008, and lasting until at least March 2012, WAKS-HD2 aired a dance radio format known as "Club Phusion". As of November 2014, WAKS-HD2 was airing a "Soul and R&B" format.

On December 11, 2018, WAKS-HD2 switched to a mainstream urban format; and also began simulcasting over low-power FM translator W291BV (106.1 FM) under the brand "Real 106.1". The simulcast was made possible by a May 3, 2010, decision by the Federal Communications Commission (FCC). Although low-power FM translators in the United States are generally not permitted to originate their own programming, the FCC decision affirmed that translators are free to retransmit the programming of HD Radio digital subchannels – effectively creating new analog "radio stations" on the FM band – and thereby expanding the potential audience of digital-only channels like WAKS-HD2. At the launch of this new simulcast, WAKS-HD2 aired 10,000 consecutive songs free of commercial interruption, and thereby positioned itself in direct competition to Cleveland hip-hop station WENZ. WAKS program director "Java Joel" Murphy was announced as the program director for Real 106.1.

FM translator

Current programming

The Breakfast Club, nationally syndicated via Premiere Networks, airs weekday mornings. All other regular content, including music and on-air talent, either comes from the iHeartMedia urban contemporary national format via Premium Choice, or is voice-tracked out-of-market specifically for WAKS-HD2.

WAKS-HD2 airs regular traffic and weather updates via the Total Traffic and Weather Network, and the station satisfies FCC-mandated public affairs programming on Sunday mornings with the City Club of Cleveland's Friday Forum. WAKS-HD2 also transmits text to HD Radio receivers, such as station IDs and artist and song information, known as Program Service Data (PSD); similarly, W256BT transmits text to compatible analog receivers via the Radio Data System (RDS). Both WAKS-HD2 and W291BV broadcast in stereo.

96.5 HD2/106.1 FM also serves as the FM radio outlet for the Cleveland Charge of the NBA G League, airing games when sister station and Charge flagship WARF AM 1350 is unable to do so because of conflicts with other events.

References

External links

2006 establishments in Ohio
HD Radio stations
IHeartMedia radio stations
Urban contemporary radio stations in the United States
Radio stations established in 2006
AKS-HD2